Cazenovia Township, Township 28 North, Range 2 West, is located in Woodford County, Illinois.  It includes most of the town of Washburn, Illinois and the villages of Cazenovia and Low Point, Illinois and is traversed by State Route 89. As of the 2010 census, its population was 1,768 and it contained 721 housing units.

The township was named after the town of Cazenovia, New York.

Geography

Demographics

References

External links
 US Census
 City-data.com
 Illinois State Archives

Townships in Woodford County, Illinois
Peoria metropolitan area, Illinois
Townships in Illinois